Akšamija is a surname, derived from Turkish akşam meaning "evening". Notable people with the surname include:

Dr. Ajla Aksamija, Bosnian American building scientists, professor and researcher
Azra Aksamija, Bosnian Austrian artist and architectural historian
Naida Akšamija (born 1991), Bosnian figure skater
, Bosnian musician and founding member of Indexi
Dr. Zlatan Aksamija, Bosnian American scientist and professor

Bosnian surnames